Catfish Haven is an indie soul rock band from Chicago. Their music was described by The A.V. Club writer Kyle Ryan in 2006 as "Creedence Clearwater Revival meets Nirvana". Ryan goes on in the same article to explain that "Because [Catfish Haven] grew up playing punk, they mostly avoid acoustic-rock conventions by channeling punk’s aggression and intensity. Few similar bands match the racket Catfish Haven makes, but few bands mix elements of folk, country, rock, and punk so well."

Catfish Haven is signed to Secretly Canadian Records. They performed at Lollapalooza 2006.

Discography
Please Come Back LP (Secretly Canadian, 2006)
Tell Me LP (Secretly Canadian, 2006)
Devastator (Secretly Canadian, 2008)

External links

Catfish Haven live on WOXY.com, December 14, 2006
Daytrotter Session (Free Songs)
Daytrotter Encore Session (Free Songs)

References

Musical groups from Chicago
Secretly Canadian artists